The grid cell topology is studied in digital topology as part of the theoretical basis for (low-level) algorithms in computer image analysis or computer graphics. 

The elements of the n-dimensional grid cell topology (n ≥ 1) are all n-dimensional grid cubes and their k-dimensional faces ( for 0 ≤ k ≤ n−1); between these a partial order A ≤ B is defined if A is a subset of B (and thus also dim(A) ≤ dim(B)). The grid cell topology is the Alexandrov topology (open sets are up-sets) with respect to this partial order. (See also poset topology.)

Alexandrov and Hopf first introduced the grid cell topology, for the two-dimensional case, within an exercise in their text Topologie I (1935).

A recursive method to obtain  n-dimensional grid cells and an intuitive definition for   
grid cell manifolds can be found in Chen, 2004. It is related to digital manifolds.

See also 
 Pixel connectivity

References 
Digital Geometry: Geometric Methods for Digital Image Analysis, by Reinhard Klette and Azriel Rosenfeld, Morgan Kaufmann Pub, May 2004, (The Morgan Kaufmann Series in Computer Graphics) 
Topologie I, by Paul Alexandroff and Heinz Hopf, Springer, Berlin, 1935, xiii + 636 pp.

Digital topology